Reinhard Dietze (18 August 1954 – 9 June 2007) was a German gymnast. He competed in eight events at the 1976 Summer Olympics.

References

External links
 

1954 births
2007 deaths
German male artistic gymnasts
Olympic gymnasts of West Germany
Gymnasts at the 1976 Summer Olympics
Sportspeople from Siegen